Silver Lake is a residential and commercial neighborhood in the east-central region of Los Angeles, California. Originally home to a small community called Ivanhoe in honor of Sir Walter Scott. In 1907, the Los Angeles Water Department built the Silver Lake Reservoir, named for LA Water Commissioner Herman Silver, giving the neighborhood its name. The area is now known for its architecturally significant homes, independently owned businesses, diverse restaurants, painted staircases, and a creative environment. The neighborhood is also home to several highly rated public and private schools.

Geography and climate
Silver Lake is flanked on the northeast by Atwater Village and Elysian Valley, on the southeast by Echo Park, on the southwest by Westlake, on the west by East Hollywood and on the northwest by Los Feliz.

Street and other boundaries are: the Los Angeles River between Glendale Boulevard and Fletcher Drive and Riverside Drive on the northeast, the Glendale Freeway on the east, Effie Street, Coronado Street, Berkeley Avenue and Fletcher Drive on the southeast, the Hollywood Freeway on the south, Virgil Avenue on the west and Fountain Avenue and Hyperion Avenue on the northwest.

The prime real estate around the Silver Lake Reservoir is known as Moreno Highlands. It was originally developed in the 1920s and 1930s by Daisy Canfield, wife of silent film star Antonio Moreno. Much of the Silver Lake Residential Historic District is associated with this tract.

The Silver Lake neighborhood council has mapped the boundaries of its council region.

History
The area known as Ivanhoe to the north of the current reservoir was originally developed by Byram & Poindexter as early as 1887, named for Sir Walter Scott's book of the same name with many streets in that area referencing other works and characters such as Herkimer, Rowena, Kenilworth, Ben Lomond, Hawick, and St. George. 

 In 1904, the Fletcher Drive Viaduct was constructed at the northeastern boundary of Silver Lake for the Glendale Line of the Pacific Electric Railway Company, connecting the area to Downtown Los Angeles. Originally constructed of timber, the viaduct was replaced in 1928 by a steel span construction to make way for Fletcher Drive underneath it. It was demolished in 1959 and only its concrete footings remain.

William Mulholland identified the area as an ideal location to place emergency reservoirs for the rapidly growing city, building the upper Ivanhoe Reservoir in 1906 and the eponymous Silver Lake reservoir in 1907.

The hills of Ivanhoe and the neighboring Edendale had always attracted bohemians seeking safe haven from the prying eyes of polite society, and the further development of Silver Lake as a lush parkland only increase its appeal. The 1930s and 1940s saw artists, writers, actors and musicians join other progressives such as union organizers, civic activists, and communists flock to the area, and with them, its modern aesthetics as architects such as Gregory Ain, Craig Ellwood, John Lautner, Rudolph Schindler, Walter Dorwin Teague, and Raphael Soriano designed their houses and businesses, creating what local realtors now point out as having more architecturally significant homes per square mile in Silver Lake than in other part of Los Angeles.

William Selig set up what may have been the first permanent film studio in Los Angeles in the Edendale neighborhood to the east of Ivanhoe valley in 1909, soon followed by Mack Sennett in 1912. Walt Disney's first studio was at the corner of Griffith Park Boulevard and Hyperion Avenue, currently the site of Gelson's Market. As a consequence, the name "Hyperion" is used by The Walt Disney Company and its subsidiaries, with company entities past and present carrying the name, such as Hyperion Books and the Hyperion Theater at Disney California Adventure Park. The fictional Seattle neighborhood of Hyperion Heights in the final season of the Disney-owned ABC series Once Upon a Time also traces its name to the same origin.

William Fox would buy Selig's former Edendale lot on Glendale Boulevard in the 1917, building a 12-acre (4.9 ha) backlot called Mixville for Western film star Tom Mix. The location is now known as the Mixville Shopping Center and occupied by a Whole Foods Market. It is rumored that Mix buried his steed "Old Blue" on the property.

The neighborhood is crisscrossed by numerous municipal staircases that provide pedestrian access up and down the neighborhood's signature hills. Among these are the Descanso Stairs, Redcliffe Stairs and the Music Box Stairs. The famous flight of stairs in Laurel and Hardy's film The Music Box are located between lower Descanso Drive and Vendome Street, as it winds up and around the hill.

The 1940s, Chinese-American architect Eugene Kinn Choy sought to build a house for his family in Silver Lake, but due to racial covenants still in effect prohibiting the sale of property to "any person not of the Caucasian race," he was prevented from doing so. He went door to door to seek the approval of every house in the neighborhood before he was given approval to build in 1949.

Choy's groundbreaking efforts opened the door to the Asian American and Latino communities in the 1950s and 1960s. Beginning in the 1970s, the neighborhood became the nexus of Los Angeles' gay leather subculture, similar to the SoMA neighborhood in San Francisco. Since the late 1990s, gentrification has changed the area by pushing out public sex and "gay cruising", and by facilitating the opening of many independent upscale boutiques, coffee shops, fitness studios, and restaurants.

The community continues to evolve, incorporating its bohemian roots with its racial and sexual diversity of the mid 20th century as architects such as Barbara Bestor and Gustavo Gubel, artists such as cache and Eric Junker, and musicians like Moby and Flea continue to define Silver Lake’s environment as a cultural and creative enclave.

LGBT community 
In the 1930s Silver Lake and Echo Park still comprised Edendale and acted as a space where members of the LGBT community were able to express their identities. Prominent female impersonator Julian Eltinge built his house in Silver Lake and performed until the city passed laws criminalizing cross-dressing, after which he continued to recount his drag performances to audiences.

Silver Lake was also home to Harry Hay, credited with founding the first gay organization, the Mattachine Society, which began as Bachelors' Anonymous. Hay lived and had meetings in Silver Lake at the time the group began in 1950. Kevin Roderick wrote in his eulogy for Hay in Los Angeles that many consider the house located near Silver Lake to be the birthplace of the gay-rights movement.

The Black Cat Tavern, a fairly popular bar that has now become a historic-cultural monument, was the site of a police raid in 1967 that spread to adjacent bars, becoming a full-blown riot, which resulted in more than a dozen arrests. The protests in response to the raid predated the Stonewall riots by two years.

Los Globos is another popular bar that has become the site of Banjee Balls where the LGBT youth come together. Voguing is a large part of the balls and brings a Paris Is Burning vibe into Los Angeles night life. The building was originally one of the earliest American Legion halls. Circus of Books was a bookstore and gay pornography shop that was notable as a gay cruising spot of the late 20th Century.

As the AIDS epidemic gripped the US in the 1980s tensions between gay men and the LAPD escalated. Several LGBT activists in Silver Lake claimed they felt unsafe reporting hate crimes against them to the police, whom they felt harbored anti-LGBT sentiments. Their complaints grew to the point that then-City Council member Michael Woo advocated to establish a hotline to relay information to police indirectly and compile statistics on the frequency of gay-bashings. Some bath houses, which acted as social spaces for gay men, were shut down by the city government in an effort to curb the spread of the virus. The ensuing controversy reflected a nationwide debate about whether this type of action constituted public health policy or perpetuation of discrimination against the LGBT community.

In 1992 about 85 activists protested gay-bashing and violent acts against homosexuals in the area, carrying banners emblazoned with “Stop the Violence” along Sunset Boulevard.

In 2019 Maebe A. Girl, who is non-binary and uses she/her and they/them pronouns, became the first drag queen ever elected to public office in the United States, due to being elected to the Silver Lake Neighborhood Council.

Reservoir

The neighborhood was named for Water Board Commissioner Herman Silver, who was instrumental in the creation of the Silver Lake Reservoir in the neighborhood, one of the water storage reservoirs established as part of the controversial Los Angeles Aqueduct project in the early 1900s. This is one of ten that still remain in Los Angeles.

In the community of Silver Lake lies the namesake reservoir composed of two basins, with the lower named Silver Lake and the upper named Ivanhoe. The lower body of water was named in 1906 for Herman Silver; the upper body received its name from the 1819 Sir Walter Scott novel Ivanhoe.

The reservoirs are owned and maintained by the Los Angeles Department of Water and Power (DWP), and provided water to 600,000 homes in downtown and South Los Angeles until 2013 when federal water quality regulations mandating reservoirs be covered; however, only the smaller of the two, Ivanhoe, remains online. At capacity, they hold 795 million gallons of water. The Silver Lake Reservoir's water resources was replaced by the Headworks Reservoir, an underground reservoir north of Griffith Park, slated for completion by December 2017.

Also within the grounds of the reservoir are several popular recreational facilities: the Silver Lake Recreation Center, which includes an adjacent city park; the  Silver Lake Walking Path, which circumnavigates the reservoirs; two enclosed dog parks, and the Silver Lake Meadow, modeled after NYC's Central Park Sheep Meadow. On the northeast corner of the property is the Neighborhood Nursery School, which since 1976 has been at the corner of Tesla Avenue and Silver Lake Boulevard. It is a parent-participation cooperative preschool, affiliated with the California Council of Parent Participation Nursery Schools.

Government
As of 2020, Silver Lake is represented by Los Angeles City Council Members Mitch O'Farrell and Nithya Raman and the Silver Lake Neighborhood Council. The Silver Lake Neighborhood Council (SLNC) was formed in the early 2000s and certified as part of the City of Los Angeles Neighborhood Council system in February 2003. Its 21-member governing board is elected for two-year terms in September. Recent projects have included "Street Medallions" created by artist Cheri Gaulke, "ArtCans", the "Electrical Art Box Project", and the second annual "Make Music LA" created by several different artists, groups, and the SLNC Arts & Culture Committee, whose current co-chairs are Renee Dawson and Dulce Stein.

The Silver Lake Residents Association, the Silver Lake Improvement Association, the Silver Lake Reservoirs Conservancy, and the Silver Lake Chamber of Commerce are all active in the area.

Demographics
The 2000 U.S. census counted 30,972 residents in the  neighborhood—an average of 11,266 people per square mile, about the same population density as in the rest of the city but among the highest in the county. In 2008 the city estimated that the population had increased to 32,890. The median age for residents was 35, about average for Los Angeles, but the percentages of residents aged 19 to 49 were among the county's highest.

The neighborhood was highly diverse ethnically. The breakdown was Latinos, 41.8%; whites, 34%; Asians and Asian Americans, 18%; blacks, 3.2%;  and others, 3.1%.  Mexico (26.6%) and the Philippines (15.7%) were the most common places of birth for the 41% of the residents who were born abroad, about the same rate as the city at large.

The median yearly household income in 2008 dollars was $54,339, about the same as the rest of Los Angeles, but a high rate of households earned $20,000 or less per year. The average household size of 2.3 people was low for the city. Renters occupied 64.3% of the housing stock, and house or apartment owners the rest.

The percentages of never-married men (52.6%) and women (38.6%) were among the county's highest. Both statistics could be due in part to the large numbers of LGBT members in the community.

Education
Thirty-six percent of neighborhood residents aged 25 and older had earned a four-year college degree by 2000, an average figure for the city.

Schools
The schools within Silver Lake are as follows:

 Allesandro Elementary School, public K–5, 2210 Riverside Drive
 Bellevue Primary School, public K–1, 610 North Micheltorena Street
 Clifford Street Elementary School, public K–5, 2150 Duane Street
 Ivanhoe Elementary School, public K–5, 2828 Herkimer Street
 Kids' World School, private K–12, 2132 Hyperion Avenue
 Micheltorena Street Elementary School, public K–6, 1511 Micheltorena Street
 St. Francis of Assisi Elementary School, parochial K–8, 1550 Maltman Avenue
 St. Teresa of Avila Elementary School, parochial K–8, 2215 Fargo Street
 Thomas Starr King Middle School, public 6–8, 4201 Fountain Avenue

Library
The Silver Lake District is also served by the Silver Lake Branch of the Los Angeles Public Library. It is located at 2411 Glendale Boulevard, in northeastern Silver Lake between the reservoir and the I-5 freeway.

Entertainment and nightlife

Silver Lake, known as one of "the city's hippest neighborhoods", has many bars, nightclubs and restaurants. Since the 1990s, the neighborhood has become the center of the alternative and indie rock scene in Los Angeles. It was home to two major yearly street festivals: the Silver Lake Jubilee, held in May and the Sunset Junction Street Fair, held in August. The last Sunset Junction festival was held in 2010 and abruptly cancelled in 2011 just days before it was supposed to take place, after years of neighborhood controversy. The Silver Lake Jubilee, the more recent addition, featured live music by local musicians, local artists and community businesses. It moved to the Arts District and changed its name to the Jubilee Music and Arts Festival in 2013.

A comparison has been drawn between New York City's Williamsburg district and Silver Lake, which has been called the "Williamsburg of the West".

In popular culture 
In addition to being the site of early Western films' star Tom Mix's studio on Glendale Boulevard, Silver Lake has been used as the film location for several films and television shows. 
 Silent star  Antonio Moreno and his wife Daisy Canfield Moreno's Canfield-Moreno Estate has been frequently used as a filming location.
 The Laurel and Hardy film The Music Box used the neighborhood's municipal staircase Music Box Stairs between lower Descanso Drive and Vendome Street.
 Sunset Triangle Plaza is featured in AMC's Fear The Walking Dead pilot episode. In the opening scene Nick Clark (Frank Dillane) is seen running frantically down a busy street before being struck by a motorist and collapsing at Griffith Park Boulevard and Edgecliffe Drive. When segueing into the show's title sequence, an aerial high-rise shot of Clark lying in the street shows the pedestrian plaza.
 In the summer of 2013, the comedy feature film Such Good People starring Michael Urie and Randy Harrison was entirely shot in Silver Lake, in and around the home of screenwriter/producer David Michael Barrett.
 The movie Under The Silver Lake (David Robert Mitchell, 2018) is set in Silver Lake.
 The Virgil, a 1920s-style saloon, is used in A Star Is Born as the setting for the drag-show scene in which Ally meets Jackson.
 Death Cab for Cutie references the neighborhood in its song "Tiny Vessels": "I spent two weeks in Silver Lake/ The California sun cascading down my face."
 The L Word: Generation Q, the sequel to The L Word, takes place in Silver Lake.
 Musician Father John Misty’s album I Love You, Honeybear contains the song “Nothing Good Ever Happens At The Goddamn Thirsty Crow”, which references a popular tavern in Silver Lake.
 Gorillaz' album Cracker Island is based on Silver Lake, with figures like Beck and references like Pauly Shore. Also the song "Idaho" from The Now Now  supposedly takes place in Silver Lake, despite the name of the song.
 You're the Worst, filmed Jimmy and Edgar's house on Redcliff Street.
 In Dragnet, (season 3, episode 27), it is revealed that Sergeant Joe Friday lives in Silver Lake.
 Much of the second season of You on Netflix was filmed and set in Silver Lake

Notable residents

 Fred Armisen, actor 
 Skylar Astin, actor/singer
 David Michael Barrett, screenwriter/producer
 Beck, musician
 Amir Blumenfeld, comedian
 David Edward Byrd, graphic artist
 Eddie Cahill, actor
 Joey Castillo, musician/drummer
 Sal Castro, educator/activist
 Eugene Kinn Choy, architect
 Rob Corddry, comedian
 Ernest E. Debs, Los Angeles politician
 Mac DeMarco, musician
 Lisa Edelstein, actor
 Jack Falahee, actor
 Flea, musician, co-founder of Silverlake Conservatory of Music
 James Franco, actor
 Judy Garland, actor
 Mike Gatto, politician
 Crispin Glover, actor
 Donald Glover, musician/comedian/actor
 Joseph Gordon-Levitt, actor
 Ryan Gosling, actor
 Kevin Griffin, musician
 Christopher Guanlao, musician
 Hannah Hart, internet personality
The Haxan Cloak (real name Bobby Krlic), musician
 Harry Hay, gay-rights activist
 Grace Helbig, internet personality, comedian
 Sandrine Holt, actor
 James Eads How philanthropist, social activist, hobo unionist 
 Mikel Jollett, musician
 Gilbert Leong, architect and banker
 Jenny Lewis, actor/singer-songwriter
 Anna Lunoe, musician
 Janet MacLachlan, actor
 Ann Magnuson, actor
 Ricardo Flores Magón,  Mexican anarchist and social reform activist
 Mako, actor
 Effa Manley, Negro League sports executive
 Laura Marling, musician
 Rachel McAdams, actor
 Tom Mix, actor
 Moby, musician and owner of Little Pine
 Antonio Moreno, silent movie star
 Johnette Napolitano, singer
 Richard Neutra, architect
 Anaïs Nin, author
 William H. Parker, Los Angeles police chief
 Cassandra Peterson, actor
 Maria Rasputin, memoirist
 Christina Ricci, actor
 Rob Schnapf, producer
 Pauly Shore, actor
 Randy Sklar, actor/comedian
 Jill Soloway, TV and film writer and director
 Kiefer Sutherland, actor
 Butch Vig, musician and record producer
Gerard Way, musician and comic book artist
 Kristen Wiig, actor
 Delbert E. Wong, LA Superior Court Judge
 Dan C. Wright, musician and producer
 Constance Wu, actor
 Benjamin Wynn, composer and music producer
 Rob Zabrecky, performer

See also

 List of Los Angeles Historic-Cultural Monuments in Silver Lake, Angelino Heights, and Echo Park

References

External links

 Silver Lake Neighborhood Council
 LA City Council District 13
 Silver Lake Forward
 Comments about living in Silver Lake
 Silver Lake crime map and statistics

 
Central Los Angeles
Gay villages in California
LGBT culture in Los Angeles
Silver Lake
Northwest Los Angeles
Populated places in the Santa Monica Mountains
Hipster neighborhoods